"Dreaming of Me" is the debut single by British electronic band Depeche Mode. It was recorded in December 1980 at Blackwing Studios and originally released in February 1981 in the UK via Mute Records. It was not commercially released in the United States.

Background
Two versions of the song have been released, one which fades out, and one which does not (cold end). The cold end version is on the 1988 CD re-release of Speak & Spell in Europe, while the American Speak & Spell (and all singles compilations containing the song) has the fade out version. The 2006 re-release of Speak & Spell also has the cold end version and was released in all regions.

The B-side, "Ice Machine", is similarly available in a fading version, and one with a cold end. The 1988 and 2006 CD re-releases of Speak & Spell (where the song is a bonus track) use the cold end version. A live version of "Ice Machine" (recorded during the Some Great Reward tour) is available on the 12" version of the 1984 single "Blasphemous Rumours".

Due to a poor chart placement in the UK (number 57), "Dreaming of Me" did not originally appear on Speak & Spell, but did show up in the CD re-release as a bonus track. However, in the United States, "Dreaming of Me" was on the original pressing of the album, replacing "I Sometimes Wish I Was Dead". On the 2006 re-release of Speak & Spell, it was placed at the end of the album, with the original UK track list preceding it.

Exactly 30 years after "Dreaming of Me" was first released in the UK, a flash mob action tried to push the track back into the charts by downloading it online. The action failed except in Germany, where the track entered the singles charts for the first time at number 45, giving the band its 47th chart entry.

Formats and track listings
All songs written by Vince Clarke. These are the formats and track listings of major single releases of "Dreaming of Me":

7": Mute / 7Mute13 (UK)
 "Dreaming of Me" (fade out version) – 3:46
 "Ice Machine" (fade out version) – 3:54

CD: Intercord Ton GmbH / INT 811.868 (W. Germany) released in 1988 
 "Dreaming of Me" (cold end version) – 4:03
 "Ice Machine" (cold end version) – 4:06

CD: Mute / CDMute13 (UK) released in 1991 
 "Dreaming of Me" (fade out version) – 3:46
 "Ice Machine" (fade out version) – 3:54

CD: Sire / 40289-2 (US) released in 1991
 "Dreaming of Me" (fade out version) – 3:46
 "Ice Machine" (fade out version) – 3:54

Charts

References

External links
 Single information from the official Depeche Mode web site
 AllMusic review 
 "Dreaming of Me" lyrics
 "Ice Machine" lyrics

1980 songs
1981 debut singles
Depeche Mode songs
Songs written by Vince Clarke
Song recordings produced by Daniel Miller
Mute Records singles
UK Independent Singles Chart number-one singles